RGBW may refer to:

Red, green, blue and white
 RGBW sensor, a color filter array
 RGBW, an LED strip light with four channels
 RGBW color wheel, in a DLP projector
 PenTile RGBW, in the PenTile matrix family
 RGBW sub-pixels, in WhiteMagic display technology

Other uses
 Royal Gloucestershire, Berkshire and Wiltshire Regiment, a former regiment of the British Army

See also
 RGB, a color model